Valeriy Tsybukh is a Soviet and Ukrainian politician and diplomat. From 1998 to 2005 he headed state agency that is in charge of tourism in Ukraine.

External links
 Valeriy Tsybukh about Petro Tronko (video)
 Information on Tsybukh at the Central Election Commission of Ukraine in 1998
 Information on Tsybukh at the Central Election Commission of Ukraine in 2012
 Profile of the Zelena planeta party at lb.ua
 History of embassy of Ukraine in Greece at the Ministry of Foreign Affairs website

1951 births
Living people
People from Storozhynets
Kyiv National University of Construction and Architecture alumni
Kyiv Higher Party School alumni
Diplomatic Academy of the Ministry of Foreign Affairs of the Russian Federation alumni
Komsomol of Ukraine members
Members of the Congress of People's Deputies of the Soviet Union
Eleventh convocation members of the Verkhovna Rada of the Ukrainian Soviet Socialist Republic
Tourism in Ukraine
Ambassadors of Ukraine to Greece
Ambassadors of Ukraine to Albania
People's Democratic Party (Ukraine) politicians
Communist Party of Ukraine (Soviet Union) politicians